Red Fang is a compilation album by American stoner metal band Red Fang, released in 2009 on the Sargent House record label.

Track listing
All tracks written by Red Fang.

Personnel
Red Fang: 
Aaron Beam – bass, lead vocals
Maurice Bryan Giles – guitars, lead vocals
David Sullivan – guitars, backing vocals
John Sherman – drums

Additional personnel: 
Adam Pike – engineering (tracks 1–4), organ on "Humans Remain Human Remains"
Nathan Abner – engineering (track 5)
Mike Anzalone – engineering (tracks 6–10)
Stephen Hawkes – mastering

References

2009 debut albums
Red Fang albums
Sargent House albums
Stoner rock albums